Ira Sone (previously Iira Soni) is an Indian television actress. She played the role of Jeena in Desh Ki Beti Nandini.

She suffers from premature ovarian failure.

Television 
 Kumkum – Ek Pyara Sa Bandhan as Neeti Damani / Neeti Rahul Wadhwa (2007–2008)
 Woh Rehne Wali Mehlon Ki as Ria Mehra
 Teen Bahuraniya as Ria Gheewala
 Raja Ki Aayegi Baraat as Rajkumari Nandini (2008)
 Saat Phere: Saloni Ka Safar as Kamini Singh (2009)
 Sabki Laadli Bebo as Simran Kapoor / Simran Karan Oberoi (2009)
 Saath Nibhaana Saathiya as Anita Mehta (2010; 2012)
 Geet - Hui Sabse Parayi as Nitya (2010)
 Sawaare Sabke Sapne... Preeto as Ishmeet (Ishu) Dhillon / Ishmeet Dhruv Ahluwalia (2011–2012)
 Desh Ki Beti Nandini as Jeena Khurana (2013)
Kundali Bhagya as Nidhi Hinduja Luthra (2023–present)

References

External links
 

Indian soap opera actresses
Indian television actresses
Living people
Year of birth missing (living people)